Travnik is a small settlement on the right bank of the Idrijca River in the Municipality of Cerkno in the traditional Littoral region of Slovenia. Travnik became a settlement in 1997, when parts of Jazne and Otalež were separated and made into an independent settlement.

References

External links
Travnik on Geopedia

Populated places in the Municipality of Cerkno